Lebedyansky pond is one in the cascade Izmaylovsky ponds in the east of Moscow (Yuzhnoe Izmailovo) in a valley of the Serebrianka on the territory of  Izmailovsky Urban Forest Park. Ponds are known from the end of  17th century and Lebedyansky is a largest of them (16 hectares). The origin of the  pond's name is not entirely clear, one of the theories that name originated from Russian word "lebyad'" - (Ru - лебедь) swan. The pond's old name is - Lebedevski. There are total of 13 ponds in cascade (Red ("Krasnyi" Ru - Красный),  Deer ( "Oleniy" Ru - Олений), Lebedyansky, Terletskiy, Three Sovhoznys and other smaller ones) connected by canals build in the late 17th century and local rivers, the Serebryanka, the Steklyanka, and the Sosenka.

Parks and gardens in Moscow
Bodies of water of Moscow
Bodies of water of Russia
Ponds of Europe